The Singapore Trade Office in Taipei is the representative office of Singapore in Taiwan located in Da'an District, Taipei, Taiwan.

It was first established in 1979 as the Trade Representative Office, before adopting its present name in 1990.

Its counterpart body in Singapore is the Taipei Representative Office in Singapore.

Mission
To safeguard the interests of Singaporeans visiting, living, studying and working in Taiwan, and to promote economic and cultural links between Singapore and Taiwan.

Transportation
The office is accessible within walking distance south west of Zhongxiao Dunhua Station of the Taipei Metro.

See also
 Singapore–Taiwan relations
 Taipei Representative Office in Singapore
 List of diplomatic missions in Taiwan
 List of diplomatic missions of Singapore

References

1979 establishments in Taiwan
Representative Offices in Taipei
Diplomatic missions of Singapore
Government agencies established in 1979
Singapore–Taiwan relations